Craig–Moffat Airport  (Craig–Moffat County Airport) is a public airport two miles southeast of Craig, in Moffat County, Colorado, United States.

Most U.S. airports use the same three-letter location identifier for the FAA and IATA, but Craig–Moffat Airport is CAG to the FAA and CIG to the IATA (which assigned CAG to Cagliari Elmas Airport in Italy).

Facilities and aircraft

(1,707 x 30 m) asphalt.

In the year ending August 29, 2005 the airport had 2,525 aircraft operations, all general aviation.

Past airline service

During the mid 1970s, the airport was served by Rocky Mountain Airways with flights to Denver (DEN) operated with de Havilland Canada DHC-6 Twin Otter turboprop aircraft.

Incident

In 2001, a McDonnell Douglas MD-80 jetliner operated by Trans World Airlines mistakenly landed at the airport during a snow shower.  TWA flight 641 from St. Louis was scheduled to land at nearby Yampa Valley Airport (HDN) in Hayden, CO.  There were no injuries sustained by the 122 people on board; however, the jet became stuck in the mud as it attempted to navigate the taxiway following the landing.

References

External links 
 Craig–Moffat County Airport, official website
 Craig - Moffat County Airport (CAG) at Colorado DOT airport directory
 

Airports in Colorado
Buildings and structures in Moffat County, Colorado
Transportation in Moffat County, Colorado